Ross Roe MacMahon (born 1698 in Enagh, Co. Monaghan) was ordained to the priesthood in 1727.  He was appointed as Roman Catholic Bishop of Clogher on 8 November 1738 following the appointment of his predecessor, Bernard MacMahon, to the see of Armagh on 8 November 1737.  Bishop MacMahon was himself appointed to the same see on 3 August 1747; he died in Armagh on 29 October 1748.  Bishop MacMahon served as Bishop of Clogher for just under nine years.

See also
Roman Catholic Diocese of Clogher

References

Roman Catholic bishops of Clogher
1698 births
1748 deaths
People from County Monaghan
18th-century Roman Catholic bishops in Ireland
Roman Catholic archbishops of Armagh